Phantasis satanica is a species of beetle in the family Cerambycidae. It was described by James Thomson in 1860.

Subspecies
 Phantasis satanica dolosa Kolbe, 1894
 Phantasis satanica satanica Thomson, 1860

References

Phantasini
Beetles described in 1860